André Felippe Di Mauro (born Rio de Janeiro, October 27, 1964) is a Brazilian actor, director, producer, writer and screenwriter. As an actor he played characters in popular works such as "Rodrigues" in the film Elite Squad and "Lipe" of the soap opera Chamas da Vida. He is the great-nephew of filmmaker Humberto Mauro, pioneer of cinema in Brazil, author of the book Humberto Mauro - the father of Brazilian cinema and director of the film "Humberto Mauro" selected for the 75th Venice International Film Festival the world premiere took place on September 5, 2018. And the premiere in Brazil took place at the 51st Festival de Brasília of Brazilian Cinema and still in 2018, the film participated in other important festivals and shows such as the 42nd São Paulo International Film Festival the 20th Festival do Rio (Première Brasil Hors Concours) and the 40th Havana Festival (in Spanish: Festival Internacional del Nuevo Cine Latinoamericano de La Habana), among others. In 2019, he participated in two more important film festivals in Europe, the 48th International Film Festival Rotterdam (International Film Festival Rotterdam - IFFR) and the 15th Play-Doc International Documentary Film Festival (Spain ) where the film won the award for "Best Film".

Filmography

Film

Television

TV

Theatre

Plays
2004 : "O Incorruptível" by Helder Costa
2003 : "Personalíssima" .... Galvão (by Júlio Ficher, Directed by Jaqueline Lawrence, Produced by Rosamaria Murtinho)
1997/1998 : "Hilda Furacão"( 1997/98) .... Frei Malthus (by Roberto Drummond, Directed by Marcelo Andrade)
1995/1996 : "The Rocky Horror Show" .... Brad (by Richard O'Brien, Directed by Jorge Fernando) (Prêmio Sharp, Prêmio Cultura Inglesa e Prêmio SATED)
1993/1994 "Spring Awakening" ("Despertar da Primavera") .... Mel (by Frank Wedekind, version by Tiago Santiago, Directed by Rogério Fabiano)
1991 : "Entre O Neon e a Lua lá de Casa" (by André Di Mauro, Directed by Anselmo Vasconcelos)
1988 : “Uma Só Andorinha Não Faz Verão“(by Giulliano Nandi, Directed by Márcio Meireles, Produced by Ítala Nandi)
1987 : “A Bela Adormecida”.... Prince Felipe (by Fernando Berditcheviski, Produced by Mírian Rios)
1986 : “A Streetcar Named Desire" ("Um Bonde Chamado Desejo”) (By Tennessee Williams, Directed by Maurice Vaneu, produced by Tereza Rachel)
1985 : “Os Doze Trabalhos de Hécules - Part 2 (by Monteiro Lobato, Directed by Carlos Wilson, Produced by Tablado)
1984 : “Azul” (by André Di Mauro, Produced by Fábio Barreto)
1983 : “Os Doze Trabalhos de Hécules - Parte 1 (by Monteiro Lobato, Directed by Carlos Wilson, Produced by Tablado)
1982 : “Vai e Vem” (by André Di Mauro, Directed by Marco Antônio Palmeira, Produced by Artimanhas D'Arte)
1981 : “Vira- Avesso” (by André Di Mauro, Directed by Milton Dobbin) - Prêmio INACEN (Instituto Nacional de Artes Cênicas) - Troféu Mambembe - Category: Revelação como Ator e Autor * Prêmio Molière de Teatro - Category: Especial

Awards and nominations

Movies, TV and Theatre

References

External links
Andre Di Mauro official site
Andre Di Mauro official brazilian site

1964 births
Living people
Brazilian male television actors
Brazilian male stage actors
Brazilian male film actors